Gadeokdo is an island of Busan, South Korea. Gadeokdo is the largest island of Busan. It is connected to the mainland by the Gadeok Bridge and Nulchagyo Bridge. It is connected to Geojedo by the Busan-Geoje Fixed Link.

The new airport is being built on the island to replace Gimhae International Airport.

Islands of Busan
Gangseo District, Busan